Huobi is a Seychelles-based cryptocurrency exchange. Founded in China, the company now has offices in Hong Kong, South Korea, Japan and the United States. In August 2018 it became a publicly listed Hong Kong company.

Following a 2017 ban on Bitcoin exchanges by the Chinese government, Huobi stopped Bitcoin withdrawals. Huobi China continues to operate as a blockchain consulting and research platform.

, Huobi processed around US $1 billion in trades daily.

History

Huobi was founded in 2013 by Leon Li. An alumnus of Tsinghua University, Li was a computer engineer at Oracle before founding Huobi.

On May 15, 2013, the Huobi Group (火币集团) acquired the huobi.com domain. On August 1, Huobi launched a simulation trading platform, and on September 1 the Bitcoin trading platform launched.  

In November 2013, Huobi received angel investments from Dai Zhikang and Zhen Fund. In 2014, Huobi raised a $10 million venture capital investment from Sequoia Capital. In August 2014, Huobi acquired Bitcoin  wallet provider Quick Wallet.

In December 2013, trading volume exceeded 30 billion yuan, making Huobi China's largest digital asset trading platform at the time. In June 2016, its total transaction volume reached 1 trillion RMB, and in November 2016 1.7 trillion yuan, accounting for more than 60% of the global bitcoin exchange market. On December 22, 2016, its daily transaction volume surpassed 200 billion yuan.

In September 2014, Huobi announced through its official Weibo account that 920 bitcoin and 8,100 litecoin had been wrongly deposited into 27 different accounts. The firm returned the lost cryptocurrency.

In August 2017 Huobi and OKCoin controversially invested 1 billion yuan ($150 million) of idle client funds into wealth-management products.

In September 2017, the Chinese government banned initial coin offerings (ICOs) and trading on domestic cryptocurrency exchanges, rendering many people's holdings effectively worthless, including those of users on Huobi's exchange. In response, Huobi adjusted its business and organizational structure to promote global expansion. In October 2017, Huobi officially expanded into Korea with a new headquarters in Seoul, South Korea, and opened trading in March 2018.

In November 2017, it launched operations in Singapore with total volume in the first month exceeding 30 billion RMB. In December 2017, it launched an office in Tokyo, Japan and announced that it would set up two crypto exchanges in Japan in early 2018, through a partnership with Japanese financial group SBI Group. In March 2018, Huobi announced that it will be launching in the United States.

In August 2018, in a reverse takeover, Huobi acquired a 74% stake in Hong Kong electronics manufacturer Pantronics Holdings, becoming listed on the Hong Kong Stock Exchange.

In November 2020, Huobi launches Huobi Labuan to realize regulated crypto exchange in Malaysia.

In September 2021, Huobi announced that it would stop serving customers in mainland China due to new regulations.

In May 2022, it was announced Huobi had acquired the Latin American crypto platform, Bitex.

Research and partnerships
In April 2015, Huobi partnered with Tsinghua University in a "Digital Asset Research Initiative", and sponsored a "Digital Asset Research Project" at the Internet Finance Laboratory of Wudaokou Tsinghua School of Finance.

On July 1, 2016, the Huobi Network Blockchain Research Center published a report, "Blockchain: Defining a New Financial and Economic Future". On December 20, 2016, Huobi joined the Fintech Digital Asset Alliance (Shenzhen) along with the Fintech Research Institute of China under the guidance of the Shenzhen Municipal Government.

References 

Bitcoin exchanges
Digital currency exchanges
Bitcoin companies
Financial services companies of China
Companies based in Beijing
2013 establishments in China